The soundtrack for the 2018 crime film Superfly was curated by American rapper Future, who also acted as a producer on the film. It features guest appearances from Miguel, Lil Wayne, Khalid, Young Thug, PartyNextDoor, H.E.R., Gunna, Sleepy Brown, and Yung Bans, among others.

Background and release
In an interview with AllHipHop, the film's director Director X stated,

On June 15, 2018, the second half of the album was released with an addition of ten tracks.

Singles
Future released the first single for the album, "No Shame" featuring PartyNextDoor, on May 4, 2018, as the lead single. A second song by Future featuring Yung Bans called "Bag" was released later in the month, as the lead promotional single. On June 5, 2018, "This Way" by Khalid and H.E.R. was released as the album's second promotional single, followed by "Walk On Minks" by Future on June 6, 2018, as the third promotional single. The album was released on June 8, 2018.

Commercial performance
Superfly Original Motion Picture Soundtrack debuted at number 25 on the Billboard 200 based on 17 million streams of its songs and 5,000 pure album sales, which Billboard equated to 15,000 album-equivalent units.

Track listing
Credits adapted from Tidal.

Notes
  signifies a co-producer
 "No Shame" features background vocals from Andrew Watt
 "New Goals" features vocals from Rico Love

Additional personnel
Credits adapted from Tidal.

Musicians
 Rose Offord – bongo 
 Andrew Watt – bass, guitar, keyboards, programming 
 Happy Perez – bass, keyboards, programming 
 Chad Smith – drums 
 Rick Nowels – electric guitar, organ, piano 
 Dean Reid – bass, keyboards, synthesizer 
 Tyler Lydell – drums, percussion 
 Mighty Mike – bass, drums, piano 
 Miguel – drums 
 Zac Rae – bass 
 Dave Palmer – keyboards 
 Dave Levita – guitar 
 Patrick Warren – strings 
 Hiko Momoji – bass, keyboards 
 Cameron Hale – guitar 
 Solomon Fagenson – bass 

Production
 Andrew "Schwifty" Luftman – production coordination 
 Zvi "Angry Beard Man" Edelman – production coordination 
 Sarah "Goodie Bag" Shelton – production coordination 

Technical
 David Rodriguez – recording 
 Eric Manco – recording 
 David "Prep" Hughes – recording 
 Miki Tsutsumi – recording 
 Tiggi – recording 
 Mark "Spike" Stent – mixing 
 Şerban Ghenea – mixing 
 Denis Kosiak – mixing 
 Michael Freeman – engineering 
 Dean Reid – engineering 
 Kieron Menzies – engineering 
 Trevor Yasuda – engineering 
 Chris Rockwell – engineering 
 John Hanes – engineering 
 Geoff Swan – engineering 
 Alex Spencer – assistant engineering 
 Mike Roett – assistant engineering 
 Glenn Schick – mastering 
 Chris Athens – mastering 
 
−	
 Colin Leonard – uncredited mastering

Charts

Weekly charts

Year-end charts

References

2018 soundtrack albums
Future (rapper) albums
Albums produced by 9th Wonder
Albums produced by Cubeatz
Albums produced by Southside (record producer)
Albums produced by the Runners
Albums produced by Young Chop
Albums produced by Zaytoven
Hip hop soundtracks
Gangsta rap soundtracks